Tragedy is the first studio album by the American musician Julia Holter, released by Leaving Records on August 30, 2011. Pitchfork wrote that Tragedy was Holter's "first LP... [which] calls to mind the arty, austere work of Laurie Anderson, Grouper, and Meredith Monk".

The album is inspired by Hippolytus, a play by Euripides. Holter recorded Tragedy with electronic instrumentation, largely out of necessity, since she lacked the funds to hire session musicians.

Reception

Tragedy was received positively by music critics, who cited Holter as an innovative avant-garde electronic artist. Mike Powell, reviewing the album for Pitchfork, wrote that "Holter has made a dreamy, intense album that aligns with a variety of traditions but, like a lot of great contemporary music, synthesizes them in novel or at least artful ways".

Track listing

References

2011 albums
Julia Holter albums
Works based on Hippolytus (play)